The 1999 Canadian Mixed Curling Championship was held January 9–17 at the Victoria Curling Club in Victoria, British Columbia.

Nova Scotia beat Prince Edward Island in the all-Atlantic final.

Teams
Teams were as follows:

Standings
Final standings

Playoffs

References

Canadian Mixed Curling Championship
Curling in British Columbia
Mixed Championship
Canadian Mixed Curling Championship
Sports competitions in Victoria, British Columbia
Canadian Mixed Curling Championship